The Texas A&M–Commerce Lions men's basketball statistical leaders are individual statistical leaders of the Texas A&M–Commerce Lions men's basketball program in various categories, including points, assists, blocks, rebounds, and steals. Within those areas, the lists identify single-game, single-season, and career leaders. The Lions represent Texas A&M University–Commerce in the NCAA Division I Southland Conference.

Texas A&M–Commerce began competing in intercollegiate basketball in 1916. However, the school's record book does not generally list records from before the 1950s, as records from before this period are often incomplete and inconsistent. Since scoring was much lower in this era, and teams played much fewer games during a typical season, it is likely that few or no players from this era would appear on these lists anyway.

A&M Commerce, then known as East Texas State, was a founding member of the NAIA in 1940, remaining in that body until 1982, when it joined NCAA Division II. The school did not join Division I until the 2022–23 season. This history is significant because the official recording of statistics began at different times in different organizations, as well as different NCAA divisions.

The NAIA record books do not indicate when the organization began officially recording statistics on a national basis, but its oldest record in any significant statistical category (as of 2022–23) dates to the 1952–53 season. The NCAA has recorded individual scoring statistics throughout the "modern era" of basketball, which it defines as starting with the 1937–38 season, the first after the center jump after each made field goal was abolished, with weekly recording of scoring leaders starting in 1947–48. Individual rebounding was first recorded in 1950–51, as were individual assists. While rebounding has been recorded in every subsequent season, the NCAA stopped recording individual assists after the 1951–52 season. Recording of assists resumed in D-I in 1983–84, but that statistic was not recorded in D-II until 1988–89. Similarly, while the NCAA started recording blocks and steals  in D-I in 1988–89, it did not record those statistics in D-II until 1992–93. The A&M Commerce record books include players in all named statistics, regardless of whether they were officially recorded by any of the governing bodies in which it was a member.

These lists are updated through the end of the 2021–22 season.

Scoring

Rebounds

Assists

Steals

Blocks

References

Lists of college basketball statistical leaders by team
Statistical